Giavera del Montello is a comune (municipality) in the Province of Treviso in the Italian region Veneto, located about  northwest of Venice and about  northwest of Treviso.

Giavera del Montello borders the following municipalities: Arcade, Nervesa della Battaglia, Povegliano, Sernaglia della Battaglia, Volpago del Montello.

The town is home to Diadora headquarters.

References

External links
 Official website

Cities and towns in Veneto